Beaumarchais is a 1996 French biopic film directed by Édouard Molinaro and starring Fabrice Luchini, Manuel Blanc and Sandrine Kiberlain. It is based on the life of the French playwright, financier and spy Pierre Beaumarchais depicting his activities during the American War of Independence and his authorship of the Figaro trilogy of plays. It was adapted from a play by Sacha Guitry.

Cast

 Fabrice Luchini – Pierre Beaumarchais, clockmaker, adventurer, arms dealer, libertine, playwright
 Sandrine Kiberlain – Marie-Thérèse Willermaulaz, Beaumarchais' partner and muse
 Manuel Blanc – Paul-Philippe Gudin de La Brenellerie, Beaumarchais' admirer, colleague and biographer
 Michel Aumont – Louis Auguste Le Tonnelier de Breteuil
 Jean-François Balmer – Antoine de Sartine, lieutenant general of the police then Navy minister, friend of Beaumarchais
 Jean-Claude Brialy – Abbot 
 Patrick Bouchitey – Monsieur Lejay, a publisher and bookseller
 Evelyne Bouix – Élisabeth Vigée Le Brun, painter, friend to the Queen who represents her at the reading committee
 Isabelle Carré – Rosine 
 José Garcia – Figaro 
 Alain Chabat – the courtier at Versailles 
 Pierre Gérard – Comte de Provence 
 Judith Godrèche – Marie Antoinette
 Murray Head – William, Lord Rochford, Beaumarchais' English friend
 Axelle Laffont – Mariette Lejay, the publisher and bookseller's wife
 Martin Lamotte – Comte de la Blache 
 Guy Marchand – Court Member 
 François Morel – Peasant in Court 
 Claire Nebout – Chevalier d'Eon
 Michel Piccoli – Prince de Conti, a nobleman who becomes friends with Beaumarchais
 Michel Serrault – Louis XV of France
 Florence Thomassin – Marion Ménard, a theater actress, one of Beaumarchais' mistresses
 Jacques Weber – Duc de Chaulnes, enemy then friend of Beaumarchais
 Jean Yanne – Louis Goëzman, the prosecutor during Beaumarchais' trial
 Dominique Besnehard – Louis XVI
 André Oumansky – The president of the court
 Maka Kotto – Cézaire, Beaumarchais' black servant
 Jeff Nuttall – Benjamin Franklin, ambassador of the United States
 Jay Benedict – The man in grey
 Dominic Gould – Arthur Lee, an American patriot
 Niels Dubost – Count Almaviva 
 Marc Dudicourt – Bartholo
 Bruno Lochet – The French jailer
 Cecile Van Den Abeele : Suzanne
 Étienne Draber : Brid'oison
 David Gabison : Doublemain
 Marie Delerm : Marceline
 Séverine Ferrer : Lison-Cherubin
 Patrice Laffont : the customs Officer
 Jean-Marie Besset : Desfontaines, an author, member of the reading committee
 Pascal Thomas : the theater critic
 Sandrine Le Berre : Conti's young daughter
 Roland Blanche : Charles Théveneau de Morande, a pamphleteer (uncredited)
 Roger Brierley : the printer

References

External links

1990s biographical films
French biographical films
Biographical films about dramatists and playwrights
Films directed by Édouard Molinaro
French films based on plays
Films based on works by Sacha Guitry
Films set in France
Films set in the 1770s
1990s French-language films
1990s French films